Simon Everard Digby (17 October 1932 – 10 January 2010) was an English oriental scholar, translator, writer and collector who was awarded the Burton Medal of the Royal Asiatic Society and was a former Fellow of Wolfson College, Oxford, the Honorary Librarian of the Royal Asiatic Society and Assistant Keeper in the Department of Eastern Art of the Asmolean Museum in Oxford. He was also the foremost British scholar of pre-Mughal India.

Early life

Digby was born in 1932 at Jabalpur in the Central Provinces, now Madhya Pradesh, and was the grandson of William Digby, a member of the Indian Civil Service who, in the late 19th century, wrote extensively about the poverty created by British rule in India. William Digby was a friend of the Bihar barrister-politician Syed Hasan Imam once the leader of the Indian National Congress. His father was Kenelm George Digby, a judge of the Indian High Court, and his mother was Violet M. Kidd, an accomplished painter. As his father was a friend of J. F. Roxburgh, the first headmaster of Stowe School, Digby was sent to that school (1946–1951) after attending a preparatory school in North Wales. In 1951 he went with his mother on a painting expedition to Delhi, Rajasthan and Kashmir. On his return to Britain he attended Trinity College, Cambridge, (Major and Senior Scholar, Earl of Derby Student),1951–1956; History Tripos, University of Cambridge (1st Class Honours with Distinction) 1956; B.A. (Cantab.) 1956, proceeded M.A. 1962; .

Cambridge

Digby knew how to read Urdu and Hindi, and while at the University of Cambridge he attended classes in Persian and began to publish his own translations of Persian poems. He lived in Whewell's Court and it was here that he welcomed Amartya Sen when he arrived in Cambridge in the summer of 1954. In 1957 he returned to India for two years sponsored by a grant from the Worshipful Company of Goldsmiths. During this time he learned about Indian art history and museology. In 1959 he travelled to Pakistan, where he visited Lahore, Rawalpindi, Balakot, the Kaghan Valley and Peshawar, among other places. On his return to London Digby lived in a tiny house in Camberwell while he studied for a PhD at the School of Oriental and African Studies where he focused on the Sultanate period.

Later years

In 1962 he returned to India where he spent almost a year in Hyderabad and another year in Delhi during which period he wrote on Indian history and contributed an article on the Emperor Humayun to the Encyclopaedia of Islam. This was his first article for this work. He also contributed to the first volume of The Cambridge Economic History of India. His first major article was Dreams and Reminiscences of Dattu Sarvani, a Sixteenth Century Indo-Afghan Soldier, which sprang from Digby's interest in medieval Indian warfare and Indian Sufism. On his return to London he became a regular reviewer in The Journal of the Royal Asiatic Society, the Bulletin of the School of Oriental and African Studies and The Times Literary Supplement. From 1968 to 1984 he was the Honorary Librarian of the Royal Asiatic Society, which involved him in ordering and cataloguing the Society's collections.

In 1971 Digby hitch-hiked to Venice with a friend, who was later the BBC World Service's regional manager in Delhi. The two left Venice and travelled by sea to Rhodes and Anatolia, and then on public transport through Turkey to Tehran, Kerman, Zahidan and Quetta. Digby was in Karachi when war broke out between India and Pakistan, and here he privately published his book War-Horse and Elephant in the Delhi Sultanate. In 1972 he was appointed to a post in the Department of Eastern Art of the Ashmolean Museum in Oxford, which had been created for David McCutchion, who had died before he could take it up.  This was to be Simon's only full-time paid position, he having benefitted from a number of legacies from deceased relatives. At the Ashmolean, and on a tight budget, he made a series of purchases of Indian decorative arts that were exceptional for their quality.

As an ex-officio member of the Oriental Faculty of the University of Oxford (1972–2000), Digby was responsible for supervising postgraduate students, and gave instruction in Hindi, Urdu and Persian. In addition, he examined postgraduate theses including that of Michael Nazir-Ali. Digby also served as visiting professor in Paris and Naples, where he lectured on Sufism and architecture. In 1999 Digby was awarded the Burton Medal of the Royal Asiatic Society and delivered a paper later published privately as Richard Burton: the Indian Making of an Arabist. In his latter years Digby lived in a cottage in Jersey which had been left to him by a relative. From here he made annual visits to India.

Simon Digby died of pancreatic cancer in Delhi on 10 January 2010, having been diagnosed with the disease only on 28 December 2009. He was cremated in India on 14 January 2010 and his ashes immersed in flowing water. Digby was unmarried and left no close relatives.

The trustees of his will, in the absence of clear instructions about what to do with his estate, sold his most valuable artefacts and established the Simon Digby Memorial Charity to promote the study of subjects in which Simon Digby was interested. The SDMC is currently funding a post doctoral fellowship at the London School of Oriental and African Studies. The fellow is completing Simon Digby's unfinished academic work and organised an international conference in his honour, held in June 2014. Oxford University Press in Delhi signed a contract in April 2016 for the publication of a ten volume 'collected works of Simon Digby' to be published over the following two years.

Select bibliography

"The Turani Takya in the Deccan: Patrons, Clients and Services", Conference on Patronage  in Mughal India, Universités de Paris, 2001: Proceedings ed. Nalini Delvoye, May 2007.
"Kipling’s Indian Magic", Indian International Centre Quarterly,  After 2007.  pp. 58–67.  
"Beatings and the sensation of release among the followers of Bābā Musāfir", Jerusalem Studies in Arabic and Islam, xxxiii (2007), pp. 487–494.
"Export industries and handicraft production under the Sultans of Kashmir", The Indian Economic and Social History Review, xliv, 4 (2007), pp. 407–423.
‘After Timur came,’ JESHO, 2007, II, pp. 1–66. 
"Between ancient and modern in Kashmir: The Rule and Role of Sultans and Sufis (1200/1300-1600)", in The Arts of Kashmir, ed. Pratapaditya Pal (New York 2007), pp. 114–125.
 Ganj: the Game of treasure from Mughal India. J.S.A.S. in 2006 or later.
Digby, Simon 'Sufis and Soldiers in Awrangzeb's Deccan', Delhi, Oxford University Press, 2001.
 Digby, Simon Wonder Tales of South Asia, Jersey, Orient Monographs, 2000.
 Digby, Simon 'War-Horse and Elephant in the Delhi Sultanate', Oxford, Orient Monographs, 1971.
 Digby, Simon Toy Soldiers and Ceremonial in Post-Mughal India, Oxford, The Ashmolean Museum, 1982 (with James Harle)
 Digby, Simon The Royal Asiatic Society : its History and Treasures, Leyden and London 1979. (edited with Stuart Simmonds)

Articles

Before Timur came : the Provincialization of the Dehli Sultanate through the Fourteenth Century, Journal of the Economic and Social History of the Orient,  V0l. 47, Pt. 3, Brill, Leiden/Boston 2004, pp. 298–356.
Bāyazīd Beg Turkmān's Pilgrimage to Makka : a Sixteenth Century Narrative, Īrān XLII, London 2004, in the press.
Obituary of James Coffin Harle, The Independent, London August 2004.
Travels with Robert, Arts of Mughal India: Studies in honour of Robert Skelton, ed. R. Crill et al., London/Ahmadabad 2004, pp. 14–19.
The Hero and his Brother the Wonder-Horse : a Nepali/Celtic Parallel,
De l’Arabie à l’Himalaya : Chemins croisés en hommage à Marc Gaborieau, ed. Véronique Bouillier and Catherine Servan-Schreiber, Paris 2004, pp. 105–21. 
Two Captains of the Jawnpur Sultanate, Circumambulations in South Asian History : Essays in Honour of Dirk H.A. Kolff, ed. Jos Gommans and Om Prakash, Brill. Leiden  2003,  pp. 159–78.
Le récit du Lieutenant Sterndale, retrouvé et transcrit par Simon Digby, Appendice 1, pp, 225–9; Sayyid Muhammad Mahdi's Visit to Chanderi, circa 1482, Appendice 6, pp, 263–5; La conquête de Chanderi par Babur: traduction d’un extrait du Ta’rīkh-i-Shāhī par Ahmad Yādgār, Appendice 8 273-5, in G. Fussman et al., Chanderi I: Naissance et déclin d’une qasba : Chanderi du Xe au XVIIIe siècle,  Paris 2003.
John Gornall, 1932–2002: Bibliography with a Memoir by Simon Digby, Orient Monographs, Jersey 2002.
The Indo-Persian Historiography of the Lodi Sultans, F. Grimal, ed., Les Sources et le temps, Pondichéry, Ēcole Française d’Extrême Orient, 2001 pp. 243–61. 
Beyond the Ocean : Perceptions of Overseas in Indo-Persian Sources of the Mughal Period, Studies in History, New Delhi, 1999. 15.2. n.s., pp. 247–59.
Before the Babas came to India : a Reconstruction of the Earlier Lives of Baba Sa’id Palangposh and Baba Musafir in "Wilayat", Iran XXXVI, London 1998, pp. 139–64.
Tulsipur Fair, or the Boy Missionary : a Model for Kipling's "Kim",  Indian International Centre Quarterly, New Delhi, Spring 1998, pp. 106–25.
Travels in Ladakh 1820–21 : the Account of Moorcroft's Munshi, Hajji Sayyid Najaf ‘Ali, of his Travels, Asian Affairs, London, xxix, pt III, Oct. 1998, pp. 299–311.
From Ladakh to Lahore in 1820–1821: the Account of a Kashmiri Traveller, Journal of Central Asian Studies, Srinagar, 1997, 8, 1, pp. 3–27.
Illustrated Books of Omens from Gujarat or Rajasthan, Indian Art and Conoisseurship : Essays in Honour of Douglas Barrett, J. Guy ed., Delhi 1996?, pp. 393–360.
The Arabian and Gulf Horse in Medieval India, Furūsiyya, Riyadh [1996], I, pp. 162–7.
Anecdotes of a Provincial Sufi of the Delhi Sultanate, Khwaja Gurg of Kara, Iran, London XXXII, London 1994, pp. 99–109.
To ride a Tiger or a Wall ? Strategies of Prestige in Indian Sufi Legend, Callewaert and Snell, ed., According to Tradition, Wiesbaden 1994, pp. 99–129.
Some Asian Wanderers in Seventeenth Century India, Studies in History, 9, 2, n.s., New Delhi, 1993, pp. 247–64.
The Mother-of-pearl Overlaid Furniture of Gujarat : an Indian Handicraft of the 16th and 17th Centuries, in Skelton et al., ed., Facets of Indian Art, London, Victoria and Albert Museum, 1992, pp. 213–22.
Flower-Teeth and the Bickford Censer : the identification of a Ninth-century Kashmiri Bronze, South Asian Studies 7, 1991, pp. 37–44.
The Sufi Shaykh and the Sultan : a Conflict of Claims of Authority, Iran XXVIII, London 1990, pp. 71–81.
The Naqshbandis in the Deccan in the Late Seventeenth and Early eighteenth Century A.D.: Baba Palangposh, Baba Musafir and their Adherents, Naqshbandis, cheminement et situation, Istanbul/ Paris 1990, pp. 167–207
Hawk and Dove in Sufi Combat, C. Melville, ed., Pembroke Papers, Cambridge, 1990, I, pp. 7–25.
An Eighteenth Century Narrative of a Journey from Bengal to England : Munshi Isma'il's New History, C. Shackle, ed., Urdu and Muslim South Asia : Studies in Honour of Ralph Russell, London, SOAS, 1989, pp. 49–66.
The Sufi Shaykh as a Source of Authority in Medieval India, Purusārtha 9, Paris, 1986, pp. 57–77.
Tabbarrukat and Succession among the Great Chishti Shaykhs of the Delhi Sultanate, in Frykenberg, ed., Delhi through the Ages, Delhi 1986, pp. 62–103.
When did the Sun Temple fall down? [written with J. C. Harle], South Asian Studies, Cambridge 1985, I, pp. 1–7.
The Tuhfa i nasa'ih of Yusuf Gada : An Ethical Treatise in Verse from the Late-Fourteenth-Century Delhi Sultanate, B. Metcalf, Moral conduct and authority  : the place of Adab in South Asian Islam, Berkeley, California 1984, pp. 91–123.
Qalandars and Related Groups : Elements of Social Deviance in the Religious Life of the Delhi Sultanate of the Thirteenth and Fourteenth Centuries, J. Friedmann, ed. Islam in Asia, Hebrew University of Jerusalem, 1984, I, pp. 60–108.
Early pilgrimages to the Graves of Mu'in al-Din Sijzi and other Indian Chishti Shaykhs, Israel and Wagle ed., Islamic Society and Culture : Essays in Honour of Professor Aziz Ahmad, New Delhi 1983, pp. 95–100.
Indian Summer: a Review of some Exhibitions held as Part of the Festival of India, The Oxford Art Journal, 5 January 1982, pp. 68–70.
The  Broach Coin-Hoard as Evidence of the Import of Valuta across the Arabian Sea during the 13th and 14th and Centuries, JRAS, London, 1980, 2, pp. 129–38.
Coinage in the Reign of Sultan Feroz Tugluq – a Literary Reference, Numismatic Digest, Bombay Dec. 1980, IV, pt II, pp. 26–31.
Popular Mughal Illustrations of Omens, in [Falk and Digby], Paintings from Mughal India, London, Colnaghi, 1979, pp. 13–19.
Muhammad bin Tughluq's Last Years in Kathiawad and his invasions of Thattha, Hamdard Islamicus, II, 1, Karachi 1979, pp. 79–88; reprinted in H. Khuhro, ed., Sind through the centuries, Karachi, OUP, 1981, pp. 130–38.
A Shah-nama Illustrated in a popular Mughal Style, Simmonds and Digby, ed., The Royal Asiatic Society  :  its History and Treasures, London 1979, pp. 111–15.
The Emperor Akbar's Atelier, Times Literary Supplement, p. 527.
Chic of Araby (A Review of the Festival of Islam in London 1975), New Statesman, London 16 April 1975, pp. 515–6.
The Tomb of Buhlul Lodi, BSOAS, London, XXXVIII, 3, 1975, pp. 550–61.
'Abd al-Quddus Gangohi (1456–1537 A. D.) : the Personality and Attitudes of a Medieval Indian Sufi Shaykh, Medieval India : a Miscellany, III, Aligarh 1975, pp. 1–66.
The Waterseller's Pilgrimage, Lycidas 3, Oxford 1975, pp. 20–21.
A Qur'an from the East African Coast, AARP [Art and Archaeology Research Papers], London, 1974?, pp. 50–55.
More Historic Kashmir Metalwork?, Iran XII, London 1974, pp. 181–5.
The Bhugola of Ksema karna: a Dated Sixteenth century piece of Indian Metalware, AARP [Art and Archaeology Research Papers] London, December 1973, pp. 10–31.
The Fate of Daniyal, Prince of Bengal, in the Light of an Unpublished Inscription, BSOAS, XXXVI, 3, 1973, pp. 588–602.
A Corpus of 'Mughal' Glass, BSOAS, XXXVI, 1, 1973m pp. 80–88.
The Coinage and Metrology of the Later Jams of Sind, JRAS, 1974, pp. 125–34.
A Medieval Kashmiri Bronze Vase, AARP[Art and Archaeology Research Paper], London, December 1972.
Anecdotes of Jogis in Sufi Hagiography, Proceedings of the Seminar on Aspects of Religion in South Asia, cyclostyle, London 1970. PDF
Iletmish or Iltutmish? A Reconsideration of the Name of the Delhi Sultan, Iran VIII, 1970, pp. 57–64.
The Literary Evidence for Painting in the Delhi Sultanate, Bulletin of the American Academy of Benares, I, i, 1967, pp. 47–58.
Dreams and Reminiscences of Dattu Sarvani, a Sixteenth Century Indo-Afghan Soldier, Indian Economic and Social Economic and Social History Review, Delhi 1965, II, 1, pp. 52–80; II, 2, pp. 178–94.
Pir Hasan Shah and the History of Kashmir, Indian Economic and Social History Review, Delhi 1964, I, 3, pp. 3–7.
A Seventeenth Century Indo-Portuguese Writing Cabinet, Bulletin of the Prince of Wales Museum of Western India, Bombay, 8, 1962–64, pp. 23–8.
Saki Nama : A Poem by Hafiz translated into English by Simon Digby, Thought, New Delhi 27 December 1958, p. 13.
Some Notes towards the Classification of Muslim Copper and Brass Work in the Museum, Bulletin of the Prince of Wales Museum of Western India, Bombay 1955–1957, 5, pp. 15–23.
 Select Reviews on Indian and Asian Art-History
 	Architectural Design, London
 C. Batley, The Design Development of Indian Architecture, XLIV, 4, 1974, 200.
 S. Crowe and others, The Gardens of Mughal India: a History and Guide, XLIII, 1, 1973, 96.
 S. Nilsson, European Architecture in India, 1750 – 1850, XLVI, 2, 1969.
 Bulletin of the School of Oriental and African Studies, London
 P. Pal, The Arts of Nepal: Part I; Sculpture, XXXIX, 2, 1976, 461–2.
 S.A.A.Rizvi, Fathpur Sikri, XXXVIII, 1, 221–2.
 [Luis de Matos], Das Relaçoes entre Portugal e Persia: Exposiçao, XXXVI, 3, 1973, 668–72.
 K.M. Varma, The Indian Technique of Clay Modelling, XXXVI, 1, 1973.
 E. Fischer and H.Shah, Rural Craftsmen and their Work: Equipment and techniques in the Mor Village of Ratadi in Saurashtra, India, XXXIV, 2, 1971,421.
 The Burlington Magazine
 ‘Art and the East India Trade:’ Notice of an Exhibition at the Victoria and Albert Museum, December 1970, 841.
 South Asian Review
 J. Irwin, The Kashmir Shawl, 8,1, October 1974, 83–4.
 P. Denwood, The Tibetan Carpet, 8,3, April 1975, 272–3.
 Times Literary Supplement
 S.J. Falk, Qajar Paintings, 6 April 1973, 374.
 S.C.Welch,  A King's Book of Kings, 4 May 1973, 508.
 B.C. Olschak, Mystic Art of Ancient Tibet, March 1974.
 B.W.Robinson, Persian Paintings in the India Office Library,
 Articles relevant to Kashmir, adjacent Territories and the Arts of Kashmir by SD
 From Ladakh to Lahore in 1820–1821: the Account of a Kashmiri Traveller, Journal of Central Asian Studies, Srinagar, 1997, 8, 1, pp. 3–27.
 Travels in Ladakh 1820–21 : the Account of Moorcroft's Munshi, Hajji Sayyid Najaf ‘Ali, of his Travels, Asian Affairs, London, xxix, pt III, Oct. 1998, pp. 299–311.
 Flower-Teeth and the Bickford Censer : the identification of a Ninth 
 Century Kashmiri Bronze, South Asian Studies 7, 1991, pp. 37–44.
 More Historic Kashmir Metalwork?, Iran XII, London 1974, pp. 181–5.
 A Medieval Kashmiri Bronze Vase, AARP[Art and Archaeology Research 
 Papers], London, December 1972.
 Pir Hasan Shah and the History of Kashmir, Indian Economic and Social 
 History Review, Delhi 1964, I, 3, pp. 3–7.
 Some Notes towards the Classification of Muslim Copper and Brass Work in the Museum, Bulletin of the Prince of Wales Museum of Western India, Bombay 1955–1957, 5, pp. 15–23.
 Reviews by SD of Works relevant to Kashmir, or Jammu and Kashmir State.
 B.N.Goswamy and J.S.Grewal, The Mughals and the Jogis of 
 Jakhbar: JRAS 3–4, London 1968, pp. 195–7. 
 R.K.Parmoo, A History of Muslim Rule in Kashmir: BSOAS XXXVIII, 3,  1970, pp. 648–50.
 S. Crowe et al., The Gardens of Mughal India: Architectural Design XLIII, 3, London, 1972, p. 6. 
 G.L.Tikku, Persian Poetry in Kashmir 1339–1846: BSOAS XXXV, 3, London 1972, p. 691.
 John Irwin, The Kashmir Shawl : South Asian Review, 8,1, London 1974, pp. 83–4. 
 Bawa S. Singh, The Jammu Fox : a Biography of Maharaja Gulab Singh of Kashmir, 1792–1857: BSOAS XXXVIII, 2, 1975, pp. 463–4. 
 D.K. Ghose, Kashmir in Transition, 1885–1893: BSOAS XXXIX, 2, 1976.

References

External links
Digby's Obituary in The Times 27 January 2010
Digby's Obituary in The Telegraph, Calcutta January 21, 2010
Obituary on History News Network

1932 births
2010 deaths
People educated at Stowe School
Alumni of SOAS University of London
Alumni of Trinity College, Cambridge
English Indologists
English orientalists
English non-fiction writers
English translators
Deaths from pancreatic cancer
Fellows of Wolfson College, Oxford
People associated with the Ashmolean Museum
English male non-fiction writers
20th-century British translators
20th-century English male writers